The Oklahoma City Chiefs football program represented Oklahoma City University and its predecessor institutions in college football. The team began play in 1905 representing Epworth University as the Epworth Methodists. Epworth closed in 1911 was replaced by Oklahoma Methodist University located in Guthrie, Oklahoma, which the football team represented from 1911 to 1916 as Oklahoma Methodist.  After a hiatus during the World War I years, the team returned to play in 1921 as the Oklahoma City Goldbugs. Oklahoma Methodist University had relocated to Oklahoma City in 1919 as was renamed as Oklahoma City College. The school adopted its current name in 1924. The football team was known as the Goldbugs through 1941. After another hiatus during World War II, the football team returned to competition in 1946 as the Chiefs. Financial pressures forced the dissolution of the football program following the 1949 season.

Championships
Oklahoma City won two conference championships during their program's existence.

Bowl game
Oklahoma City participated in the 1948 Glass Bowl.

NFL draftees
Oklahoma City had six players selected in National Football League Draft between 1947 and 1950.

References

 
American football teams established in 1905
American football teams disestablished in 1949
1905 establishments in Oklahoma Territory
1949 disestablishments in Oklahoma